Yoshio (Yosh) Nakano is a professional poker player and entrepreneur who resides in Long Beach, California.

He has played professionally for over 20 years and is a long-time regular at high-stakes poker tables at the Bicycle Casino in Los Angeles. He was a co-founder and a "resident pro" at the online poker site PokerBlue, before it closed down in March 2007.

He represented Japan in the inaugural Intercontinental Poker Championship. Nakano defeated Lithuanian Tony G two out of three matches at the heads-up final table to take down the $350,000 first place money.

As of 2008, Nakano's live tournament winnings exceed $610,000.

Notes

Japanese poker players
American poker players
Living people
Year of birth missing (living people)